Steven Guilbeault  (born June 9, 1970) is a Canadian politician and former activist who has served as Minister of Environment and Climate Change since October 26, 2021. A member of the Liberal Party, Guilbeault has sat as a member of Parliament (MP) since the 2019 federal election, representing the Montreal riding of Laurier–Sainte-Marie in the House of Commons. Guilbeault was previously the minister of Canadian heritage from 2019 to 2021.

A founding member of Équiterre, a Quebec environmental organization, he was also director and campaign manager for the Greenpeace Quebec chapter for ten years. Guilbeault stepped down as senior director and spokesperson for Équiterre in November 2018, and in July 2019 was nominated as a federal Liberal candidate in the 2019 election.

Early life and education
The son of a butcher, he is of French Canadian descent although his maternal grandmother, Edna O'Farrell, was Irish Canadian. When he was five years old in his hometown of La Tuque in Haute-Mauricie, Guilbeault refused to get down from a tree that he had climbed, in an effort to block a land developer from clearing a wooded area behind his home. The tree was felled a few days later, but the event is cited by Guilbeault as the genesis of his environmental activism.

After studying computer science in CEGEP, he enrolled in industrial relations at the Université de Montréal in 1989. A year later, he switched his major to political science. He minored in theology, exploring questions of international morality, liberation theology, poverty and the environment.

Guilbeault became president of his faculty's student association and also took part in activities organized by Equitas (known at the time as the Canadian Human Rights Foundation). There he met Laure Waridel, Sydney Ribaux and François Meloche, with whom he would go on to found Équiterre a few years later.

While in university, Guilbeault worked for two years (1992-1993) with the Canadian Human Rights Foundation, an organization dedicated to educating people, both at home and abroad, about human rights issues.

Early career
After the Earth Summit in Rio de Janeiro in 1993, Guilbeault, Laure Waridel, Elizabeth Hunter, Patrick Henn, François Meloche and Sidney Ribaux founded Action for Solidarity, Equity, Environment and Development (ASEED). It acquired not-for-profit status in 1995. In 1998 it was rebranded as Équiterre. The organization's goal is to propose concrete solutions to make Canada a society where sustainable development and social economy would be central to the actions and concerns of its citizens, organizations and government. Steven Guilbeault was a member of Équiterre's board of directors for many years.

In 1997, Guilbeault joined Greenpeace Canada. He was put in charge of its climate change division and he managed the climate and energy campaign before being the organization's Quebec bureau chief in 2000. In 2005, he coordinated the climate campaign for Greenpeace International. On four occasions, Guilbeault made headlines for Greenpeace, such as when he scaled Toronto's CN Tower in 2001, accompanied by British activist Chris Holden. At the time the tower was the tallest in the world. After ascending to a height of 340 metres, they unfurled a banner that read: "Canada and Bush Climate Killers." Guilbeault and Holden were arrested and charged with mischief. The goal was to grab the world's attention a week before the UN's sixth conference on climate change, where the fate of the Kyoto Protocol would be decided. The stunt cost the CN Tower Corporation an estimated $50,000, and Guilbeault was sentenced to one year's probation and the court ordered him to pay a portion of costs. Guilbeault remained Greenpeace's Quebec spokesperson until June 8, 2007, at which time he announced his resignation.

In 2008, he returned to Équiterre, which he had cofounded fifteen years earlier, to work on climate change issues. He left that position in autumn 2018.

Government work
He also sat on the climate change advisory committees of three successive Quebec governments: Jean Charest’s Liberals, Pauline Marois’ Parti Québécois, and subsequently co-chairing the committee formed by Philippe Couillard’s Liberal government starting in 2014.

Stéphane Dion, a former federal Cabinet minister, remarked that Guilbeault "is among the select few in the environmental community with whom it is important to remain in contact, because his reactions and his opinions will count". Kalee Kreider, formerly with Greenpeace and former communications director for Al Gore, said that Steven Guilbeault "has at once gained the respect of those in government, NGOs and industry."

Other professional activities 
Guilbeault has been a commentator for CBC/Radio-Canada, La Presse and Corporate Knights magazine, and has been a columnist for the  newspaper for nearly a decade. He worked as a senior consultant for Deloitte and Touche, and served as co-chair of Climate Action Network International for five years. He also chaired the Chamber of Commerce of Metropolitan Montreal's Committee on Sustainable Development from 2007 to 2010.

Since 2009, Guilbeault has been a strategic consultant for Cycle Capital Management's venture capital fund, which is dedicated to developing clean technologies.

Political career 
On June 19, 2019, Guilbeault announced that he was seeking the Liberal Party of Canada nomination for the riding of Laurier—Sainte-Marie in the 2019 Canadian federal election. On October 21, 2019, he was elected with 41.77 per cent of the vote, flipping a riding once held by New Democratic Party MP Hélène Laverdière.

Minister of Canadian Heritage 
On November 20, 2019, Guilbeault was named as the Trudeau government's minister of Canadian heritage, succeeding Pablo Rodríguez.

Bill C-10 (2021) 

In 2021, Guilbeault introduced a bill (C-10) to amend the Broadcasting Act, to modernize the legislation to include online broadcasting services. The proposed amendment faced round criticism in the media, with concerns that it could be used limit freedom of speech or expression on social media. Following calls by the New Democratic Party and Conservative opposition, the government introduced further amendments, clarifying that social media would not be regulated under the proposed legislation. Guilbeault has stated that users with a large social media presence could be considered "broadcasters," and thus be subject to government oversight and regulations.

Minister of Environment and Climate Change 
Following the 2021 Canadian federal election, Guilbeault was named as the new environment minister, taking office on October 26. His appointment drew heavy commentary, with his background as a former environmental activist attracting both praise and criticism.

In Alberta, Guilbeault faced shared criticism from both the governing United Conservative Party (UCP), and the opposition New Democratic Party (NDP). Premier Jason Kenney expressed  hope that "he will send a signal that he is willing to work constructively and cooperatively with us, as partners, in reducing greenhouse gas emissions while growing the economy," and also stated that he was worried Guilbeault would impose a "radical agenda that would lead to mass unemployment." Provincial environment minister Jason Nixon echoed Kenney's concerns and called Guilbeault a "radical environmentalist". NDP leader Rachel Notley agreed with the government, adding "I share some of the concerns about some of the historical positions taken by (Guilbeault) in the past, some of his anti-pipeline commentary, that is certainly troubling".

In March 2022, Guilbeault issued the first Emissions Reduction Plan under the Canadian Net-Zero Emissions Accountability Act. Progress under the plan will be reviewed in progress reports produced in 2023, 2025, and 2027. Additional targets and plans will be developed for 2035 through to 2050. The 2030 Emissions Reduction Plan is Canada’s first detailed, comprehensive roadmap to reach the country’s emissions reduction target of 40 to 45 percent below 2005 levels by 2030.

In April 2022, however, Guilbeault was specifically targeted by NDP and environmental organizations with criticisms of his government's approval of the Bay du Nord offshore oil project.

Honours 
He is also an honorary fellow of the Royal Canadian Geographical Society. He was recognized as one of the 35 most influential figures in the past 35 years by the Fondation Marie-Vincent in 2010 and as an Americas Leader by the US magazine Americas Quarterly.

In 2016, Guilbeault received the  award recognizing his contribution to the vitality of the French language and French culture.

Electoral record

Selected publications 
Steven Guilbeault, Le bon, la brute et le truand - Ou comment l’intelligence artificielle transforme nos vies, Montréal, (Québec), Éditions Druide, 2019.
Steven Guilbeault and François Tanguay, Le prochain virage, Montréal, (Québec), Canada, Éditions Druide, 2014, 304 pages.
Steven Guilbeault, Alerte! : Le Québec à l'heure des changements climatiques, Montréal, (Québec), Canada, Éditions du Boréal, 2010, 248 pages.
Steven Guilbeault and Jean-Guy Vaillancourt, Changements climatiques, protocole de Kyoto et le rôle des organisations non gouvernementales dans le cadre de ces grandes questions internationales, in Gendron Corinne and Jean-Guy Vaillancourt, Développement durable et participation démocratique : De la contestation écologiste aux défis de la gouvernance, Presses de l’Université de Montréal, Montréal, 2003.
Steven Guilbeault and Jean-Guy Vaillancourt, Protocole de Kyoto : économie, politique et efficacité environnementale, in Actes de colloque Sociologie, économie et environnement, ACFAS, Québec, May 2002, pp. 223–239.
Regroupement montréalais pour la qualité de l’air, Pollution atmosphérique et impacts sur la santé et l’environnement dans la grande région de Montréal, Chapitre 3: « Les effets néfastes de la pollution atmosphérique d’origine anthropique sur l’environnement de la grande région de Montréal », pp. 155–173, Éditeur Direction régionale de la santé publique, Montréal, 1998.

References

External links
 Official site
 Mandate letter
 

Living people
1970 births
Canadian environmentalists
Canadian feminists
Ecofeminists
People from La Tuque, Quebec
Quebec people of Irish descent
Politicians from Montreal
People associated with Greenpeace
Members of the House of Commons of Canada from Quebec
Liberal Party of Canada MPs
21st-century Canadian politicians
Members of the 29th Canadian Ministry
Members of the King's Privy Council for Canada
Articles containing video clips